Eurajoki TV Mast is a mast in Eurajoki, Finland. It has a height of 321 metres (1053 feet).

See also
List of tallest structures in Finland

Notes

Communication towers in Finland
Transmitter sites in Finland